Brent Edward Hefford (born 8 May 1978) is a New Zealand cricketer who plays for the Central Districts Stags in the State Championship and in the State Shield. He also plays for Marlborough in the Hawke Cup competition. He was born in Blenheim.

External links
Cricinfo article on Brett Hefford
 

1978 births
Living people
New Zealand cricketers
Central Districts cricketers
Cricketers from Blenheim, New Zealand
South Island cricketers